The Tornado outbreak sequence of May 6–27, 1995 was a  long-lasting tornado outbreak sequence during May 1995. Thirteen deaths occurred due to the outbreak. Nearly 300 tornadoes occurred during this period from the Central US through the Southeast and into the Mid-Atlantic. The main event days were May 6 – May 7, May 9, May 13, May 18, and May 27.

May 13 tornadoes in the Midwest 
Another tornado outbreak which the National Weather Service issued a high risk for occurred in Illinois, Indiana, and Kentucky.  The tornadoes that occurred on this day resulted in three deaths all from the same tornado that moved through Montgomery and Boone Counties in Indiana just west of Indianapolis. A tornado also hit the eastern sections of the Indianapolis area causing damage to dozens of structures but no injuries. Several destructive tornadoes also touched down south and west of the Peoria, Illinois Metro Area including two F4s that resulted in 50 injuries.

May 18 tornado outbreak 
This was the tornado outbreak responsible for the Anderson Hills Tornado which killed one person. In southern Middle Tennessee, an F4 tornado in Lawrence County, Tennessee and Giles County, Tennessee struck the town of Ethridge and killed three people. The National Weather Service weather forecast office in Nashville, Tennessee said that May 18, 1995 was the 3rd worst tornado outbreak to hit middle Tennessee. Nearly 80 tornadoes touched down during that day. In addition to the two killer tornadoes, three tornadoes touched down in and around the Bowling Green, Kentucky area destroying numerous structures including inside the city limits. Other tornadoes struck the Knoxville and northeastern Nashville areas. Nearly 30 people were injured in Sumner County, Tennessee northeast of Nashville.

Confirmed tornadoes

See also 
 List of North American tornadoes and tornado outbreaks
 Tornado outbreak of April 15–16, 1998
 Tornado outbreak sequence of March 9–13, 2006

References 

 http://www.spc.noaa.gov/archive/severe_archive/
 https://web.archive.org/web/20100506004830/http://www4.ncdc.noaa.gov/cgi-win/wwcgi.dll?wwevent~storms
 NWS Nashville, TN summary of May 18, 1995 tornado outbreak
 Major Tornado Outbreak in East Tennessee - May 18, 1995

F4 tornadoes by date
 ,1995-05-06
Tornadoes of 1995
Tornadoes in Texas
Tornadoes in Oklahoma
Tornadoes in Tennessee
Tornadoes in Alabama
Tornadoes in Illinois
Tornadoes in Indiana
Tornadoes in Kentucky
Tornadoes in Washington, D.C., by date
 ,1995-05-06
1995 natural disasters in the United States
1995 in Alabama
1995 in Indiana
1995 in Illinois
1995 in Oklahoma
1995 in Tennessee
1995 in Texas
1995 in Kentucky
May 1995 events in the United States